Vasilios Papafotis (born 10 August 1995) is a Cypriot professional footballer who plays as an attacking midfielder for AEL Limassol.

Career

APOEL
Papafotis is a product of APOEL Academies. He signed his first professional contract with APOEL on 3 December 2013 and made his official debut on 19 December 2013, playing for 60 minutes in a Cypriot Cup match against Digenis Oroklinis. Three days later, on 22 December 2013, he made his league debut, coming on as a substitute in APOEL's 3–0 away win against Enosis Neon Paralimni.

During his first two seasons at APOEL, Papafotis celebrated two consecutive doubles, as the club won both the 2013–14 and 2014–15 season's championship and cup. After the end of the 2015–16 season, in which he crowned champion for a third time in the row, Papafotis signed a new two-year contract extension with APOEL.

AEL
On 17 July 2018, Superleague club AEL officially announced the signing of Papafotis on a three-year deal.

Career statistics

Club

Honours
 APOEL
Cypriot First Division (4): 2013–14, 2014–15, 2015–16, 2016–17
Cypriot Cup (2): 2013–14, 2014–15

References

External links
 APOEL official profile
 

1995 births
Living people
Greek Cypriot people
Cypriot footballers
Cyprus youth international footballers
Cyprus under-21 international footballers
Cyprus international footballers
Association football midfielders
Cypriot First Division players
APOEL FC players
Doxa Katokopias FC players
AEL Limassol players